Gim Seokju (Korean: 김석주, hanja: 金錫冑, 1634 – September 20, 1684) was one of the Neo-Confucian scholars, politicians and writers of the Korean Joseon Kingdom. His nickname was Sigam (식암, 息庵), a courtesy name was Sabaek (사백, 斯百). He was a cousin of Queen Myunseong.  He was Chief State Councillor of the Joseon Kingdom in 1680.

Books
 'Shikamjip' (식암집, 息庵集)
 'Beolgo' (별고, 別稿)
 'Haedongsabu' (해동사부, 海東辭賦)
 'Shikamyugo' (식암유고, 息菴遺稿)
 'Hanggunsooji' (행군수지, 行軍須知)
 'Gomunbaiksun' (고문백선, 古文白選)
 'Hangoojasu' (한구자수, 韓構字藪)
 Chunsojhajipseomun (춘소자집 서문, 春沼子集 序文)

See also 

 Song Siyeol
 Yun Seondo
 Hong Woo-won
 Kim Ik-hun
 Kim Manjung
 Kim Yuk
 Kim Woo-myung
 Song Jun-gil

References

External links 

 Gim Seokju  
 Gim Seokju:Naver 
 Gim Seokju 
 Gim Seokju 

1634 births
1684 deaths
17th-century Korean writers
Korean Confucianists
17th-century Korean philosophers
Neo-Confucian scholars
Joseon scholar-officials